Belagavi Uttar (North Belgaum) Assembly Seat is one of the seats in Karnataka Legislative Assembly in India. It is a segment of Belagavi (Lok Sabha constituency). The seat came into existence when the assembly map was redrawn in 2008. Prior to that most of its area was under the now defunct Uchagaon.

Members of Assembly
 1967-2004 : See Belagavi Assembly constituency, Bagewadi Assembly constituency, Uchagaon Assembly constituency
 2008: Fairoz Nuruddin Saith (INC) 
 2013: Fairoz Nuruddin Saith (INC)

Election results

2008 Election 
 Feroz Nuruddin Sait (INC) : 37,527 votes  
 Shankargouda I Patil (BJP) : 34,154

2013 Election 
 Fairoz Nuruddin Saith (INC) : 45,125 votes  
 Renu Suhas Killekar (IND/MES) : 26,915

2018 Election 
 Anil S Benake (BJP) : 79,060 votes  
 Fairoz Nuruddin Saith (INC) : 61,793

See also 
 Belagavi District
 List of constituencies of Karnataka Legislative Assembly

References

Assembly constituencies of Karnataka